Chorbogh is a village and jamoat in Tajikistan. It is located in Varzob District, one of the Districts of Republican Subordination. The jamoat has a total population of 31,585 (2015). Villages: Araqchin, Gulbogh, Darai Bedho, Darai Foni, Dahana, Duoba, Kulihavoi, Mehrobod, Obizak, Sari Kutal, Chorbogh, Chormaghzakoni Bolo, Chormaghzakoni Poyon, Shodob, Sholiqunghurot, Yakkachughuz, 
Jangalak.

References

Populated places in Districts of Republican Subordination
Jamoats of Tajikistan